The ESh2 Eurasia (also Yevraziya) is the Russian gauge version of the Stadler KISS double-deck electric train. These trains are used by three operators— Aeroexpress, Azerbaijan Railways and Georgian Railways.

History
In 2014, due to the growth of passenger traffic on the routes connecting urban stations to airports, Aeroexpress has signed a contract with Stadler AG: a contract for production of 25 double-deck Stadler KISS family—16 4-car set and 9 6-car version. The cost of all 118 cars is 385.31 million euros. According to the production plan, the first three trains will be fully assembled in Altenrhein's research and development center of Stadler. Assembly of the remaining 22 trains will be carried out in Stadler's new plant in Minsk.

For the first time, in early February 2014, the body of the motor car trains for the future was presented at the plant in Altenrhein. In August 2014, the plant produced the first six-car train ESh2-001, which was soon sent on the ferry to Klaipeda. In October 2014, the train arrived in Minsk for acceptance, commissioning tests. In November, its presentation took place in Moscow's Ilyich Train Depot; soon the second train arrived. Both trains were painted red with black bands at the level of the windows.
Later, due to lack of funds caused by the decline of the ruble against the euro, Aeroexpress has further delayed the purchase of new electric trains.  As a result of this funding crisis, the delivery of the first two trains manufactured in Belarus has never been carried out, and the third train was taken on the ferry to Lithuania and finally sent to Fanipol in April 2015.

On 13 May 2015 Azerbaijan Railways ordered 5 trains of this type.

Tests
During the testing of the trains, they made a number of experienced travels without passengers on routes Shcherbinka–Moscow, Shcherbinka–Kubinka and Moscow–Vladimir.

In the period 2015–16, the gradual introduction of the trains in regular operation is planned on the Moscow Railway as Aeroexpress trains from Belorussky, Kievsky and Paveletsky railway stations to airports Sheremetyevo, Vnukovo and Domodedovo.

Variants

The variants of Russian bilevel EMUs are:
 DC sets with high doors (existing);
 DC sets with high and low doors;
 AC sets with low doors; and
 AC/DC sets with low doors.

The high doors are accessible with the  platforms, while the low doors are accessible with the  platforms and the  platforms.

Photos of interior

Videos

References

Links

 Photos on Trainpix.org
 Photos on Parovoz.com
 Evrazia on Aeroexpress website

Rolling stock of Russia
Stadler KISS
Articles containing video clips